This is a list of some of the most popular freeware and free and open-source software first-person shooter games.

Freeware clients
Some free-to-play online first-person shooters use a client–server model, in which only the client is available for free. They may be associated with business models such as optional microtransactions or in-game advertising. Some of these may be MMOFPS, MMOTPS or MMORPG games.

Game engines

See also 

 List of open-source video games

References

First-person shooters, List of